Robert Kane Bergloff (born July 26, 1958) is an American retired ice hockey defenseman. He played 2 games in the National Hockey League for the Minnesota North Stars during the 1982–83 season.

Career statistics

Regular season and playoffs

International

External links
 

1958 births
Living people
American men's ice hockey defensemen
Birmingham South Stars players
Dundee Tigers players
GIJS Groningen players
Ice hockey players from Minnesota
Ice hockey people from North Dakota
Minnesota Golden Gophers men's ice hockey players
Minnesota North Stars draft picks
Minnesota North Stars players
Nashville South Stars players
People from Dickinson, North Dakota
NCAA men's ice hockey national champions
New Haven Nighthawks players
Salt Lake Golden Eagles (CHL) players
Salt Lake Golden Eagles (IHL) players
Sportspeople from Bloomington, Minnesota
Toledo Goaldiggers players